Grand Champ is the fifth studio album by American rapper DMX. It was released on September 16, 2003 by Ruff Ryders Entertainment and Def Jam Recordings.The album was produced by multiple producers, including Swizz Beatz, Dame Grease, Kanye West, and No I.D. It features guest appearances from 50 Cent, Cam'ron, Eve, Styles P, Monica, and Jadakiss, among others.

Grand Champ was supported by two singles: "Where the Hood At?" and "Get It on the Floor". Despite receiving generally mixed reviews from music critics, the album was a commercial success. It debuted at number one on the US  Billboard 200 chart, selling 312,000 copies in its first week.

Singles
The album was supported by two singles. The first single, "Where the Hood At?" was released on August 5, 2003. The single peaked at number 68 on the US  Billboard Hot 100 and number 24 on the US Hot R&B/Hip-Hop Songs charts respectively. The single also peaked at number 16 on the UK Singles Chart, becoming his second top 20 song on that chart. The second single, "Get It on the Floor" was released on December 30, 2003. The song was produced by and features a guest appearance by Swizz Beatz. The single failed to chart on the  Billboard Hot 100 but managed to peak at number 57 on the US Hot R&B/Hip-Hop Songs and number 34 on the UK Singles Chart, becoming his fifth UK top 40.

Other songs
On the international version of the album "X Gon' Give It to Ya" was added as a bonus track. The single was originally released on December 10, 2002. It served as the theme song for the 2003 film "Cradle 2 the Grave" which DMX also starred in. The song peaked at number 60 on the US Billboard Hot 100 and number 23 on the US Hot R&B/Hip-Hop Songs charts respectively. The song also peaked at number six on the UK Singles Chart, becoming his only UK top-ten hit.

Critical reception
Grand Champ received generally mixed reviews from music critics. At Metacritic, which assigns a normalized rating out of 100 to reviews from professional publications, the album received an average score of 58, based on twelve reviews. Jason Birchmeier of AllMusic praised DMX's effort stating that, "It's a well-crafted and thought-out album but feels like a sequel, and as such, it serves its purpose: to satisfy fans and move units." But Birchmeier also stated that it was "Not quite the big comeback DMX needed at this point in his quietly sagging rap career." In addition, he stated that, "Longtime fans may decide to drop off at about this point, if they hadn't already, while those content with the usual—or new to DMX—should find plenty to savor on Grand Champ." Birchmeier ultimately give the album a 3.5 star rating out of 5.

Commercial performance
Grand Champ debuted at number one on the US  Billboard 200 chart, selling 312,000 copies in its first week, according to Nielsen Soundscan. This became DMX's fifth US number one debut on the chart. In its second week, the album dropped to number seven on the chart, selling an additional 150,000 copies. On November 7, 2003, the album was certified platinum by the Recording Industry Association of America (RIAA) for shipments of over one million copies in the US. As of October 2009, the album has sold 1,204,000 copies in the United States.

Track listing
Credits adapted from the album's liner notes.

Notes
 signifies a co-producer.
 signifies an additional producer.

Sample credits
 "Where the Hood At?" contains an interpolation of "Young, Gifted & Black", written by Antonio Hardy.
 "Dogs Out" contains a sample of "Dedicated to the One I Love", written by Ralph Bass and Lowman Pauling, and performed by Stacy Lattisaw.
 "Untouchable" contains an interpolation of "Why You Treat Me So Bad", written by Jay King, Denzil Foster, and Thomas McElroy.
 "Fuck Y'all" contains a sample of "What Do You Want Me To Do", written by Lou Courtney, and performed by Ben E. King.
 "We Go Hard" contains a sample of "Didn't I Fool You", written by Fred Bridges, Richard Knight, Robert Eaton, and Ric Williams, and performed by Ruby Andrews.
 "We 'Bout to Blow" contains a sample of "Sesame Street", written by Clarence Reid, and performed by Blowfly.
 "The Rain" contains a sample of "Will She Meet The Train in the Rain", written by Leonard Perry, Katie Davis, and Mallory Cowart, and performed by Greg Perry.
 "Thank You" contains a sample of "Make the Music With Your Mouth", written by Marcel Hall and Marlon Williams, performed by Biz Markie. It also contains a sample of "I Want To Thank You" written by Kevin McCord, and performed by Alicia Myers.

Charts

Weekly charts

Year-end charts

Certifications

References

External links

DMX (rapper) albums
2003 albums
Albums produced by Swizz Beatz
Albums produced by DJ Scratch
Albums produced by Rockwilder
Albums produced by Kanye West
Albums produced by Ron Browz
Albums produced by No I.D.
Albums produced by Dame Grease
Def Jam Recordings albums
Ruff Ryders Entertainment albums